The Mandeville School is a coeducational secondary school and sixth form located in Aylesbury, Buckinghamshire, England.

Built in the 1960s, there are approximately 1050 students currently attending Mandeville, aged between 11 and 18 years.

Currently graded Requires Improvement, the school has had several changes of leadership in recent years. The Headteacher Matthew Larminie has been in post since September 2020.

History
In 1996 a new headteacher with a reputation for turning failing schools around took over and the school saw significant changes. The level of students being excluded (either temporarily or permanently) from the school dropped and exam passes increased.

During the 1970s, England Rugby Prop Forward, Gary Pearce attended the school and played several games against Aylesbury Grammar School.
In July 2004 the school was awarded specialist school status as a Sports College, an accolade reserved for the more successful schools in England.

Previously a community school administered by Buckinghamshire Council, in January 2022 The Mandeville School converted to academy status. It is now sponsored by the Insignis Academy Trust.

Mobile phone masts
Mandeville School is one of several Buckinghamshire schools which host mobile phone masts. Contracts between Buckinghamshire Council and various mobile phone operators generate an income of £145,000 per annum, of which about £59,000 comes from contracts for masts that are installed in schools.

References

External links 
Department for Education Performance Tables 2011

Aylesbury
Secondary schools in Buckinghamshire
Academies in Buckinghamshire